Abaetetuba is a genus of harvestmen in the family Sclerosomatidae.

Species

References 

Harvestman genera
Harvestmen
Sclerosomatidae